Ah! La Barbe (English: Ah! Beard, known in the United States as A Funny Shave) is a 1905 French short film directed by Segundo de Chomón. The film shows a man who, whilst shaving, eats a portion of his shaving cream. This causes him to see hallucinations of grotesque faces in his mirror, which brings him to shatter the glass.

References

External links

1905 films
Films directed by Segundo de Chomón
French comedy films
French silent short films
Articles containing video clips
French black-and-white films
1905 comedy films
Silent comedy films
1900s French films